Allodynerus is a palearctic genus of potter wasps.

References

Biological pest control wasps
Potter wasps
Hymenoptera genera